Eugene Walter Dyker (February 17, 1930 –  January 26, 1966) was a forward in the National Basketball Association. He was drafted by the Milwaukee Hawks in the 1953 NBA draft and played with the team that season.

References

1930 births
1966 deaths
Basketball players from Chicago
DePaul Blue Demons men's basketball players
Forwards (basketball)
Milwaukee Hawks draft picks
Milwaukee Hawks players
Date of death missing
Place of death missing